Jim's Mowing is a lawn care service franchise which was founded in 1982 by Jim Penman. Penman initially launched it as a part-time gardening business while he was completing his PhD in history. He remains CEO of the group and actively involved in day-to-day operations. The business was run independently until 1989, when it became a franchise, which can now be found across four different countries, with 4,000 total franchisees.

After launching the Jim's Mowing Franchise in 1989, further divisions followed. The second division was Cleaning, and since then the franchise model has been adapted to almost 50 different service industries (including plumbing, fencing, roofing) and multiple countries (including the United Kingdom, New Zealand, and Canada).

In 2019, Jim's Group is the largest home-service franchise in Australia. It has an annual turnover of over $500 million, approximately 4,000 franchises and about 35,000 customers.

History 
In 1982, Jim Penman started the company with $24 of capital in order to fund his research into biohistory after his PhD thesis is initially rejected.

In 1989, Jim's Group switches to a franchise model.

In 2006, Jim's Group received more than 100,000 leads that were unable to be serviced.

In 2009, there was a major disruption from the franchisees when fees were raised and Jim Penman was almost voted out.

In 2010, master franchisors held a "referendum" asking for Penman to stand down because of concerns with his leadership style, breaches of contract, and steep fee hikes. Although the referendum followed the procedures in the operation manual, Jim advised he could not be stood down and that only he could run the company; eventually, negotiations occurred which reached agreement on the fee and master franchise issues. A number of concerns about Penman were also raised by disgruntled franchisees including that "he runs the whole business as though he owns every part of it", changes had reduced the value of their investment, and litigation.

In 2012, there was an unsuccessful bid for $10 million in funding to expedite expansion including a float on the ASX, which has not since been realised.

In 2018, the Jim's Group launched the Jim's Plus initiative claiming to have received over 180,000 leads that were unable to be serviced.  This program offers these leads on a success fee basis to non-Jim's franchisees.

In 2020, during the COVID-19 pandemic, Mr Penman encouraged his Victorian franchisees to ignore the Stage 4 restrictions. He offered to pay any fines that they received.

Foothills Conference Centre, and Headquarters

Jim's established a conference centre for training franchisees at Lilydale, Victoria. This also serves as the group headquarters, and includes a call centre. Several lodges of various sizes have generously appointed ensuite bedrooms equivalent to hotel rooms, surrounding a multi room conference venue with restaurant and bar. The hotel rooms are also available to the public on a space available basis.

References

External links

Service companies of Australia
Companies established in 1982
1982 establishments in Australia